The 2020 Winnipeg Blue Bombers season was scheduled to be the 63rd season for the team in the Canadian Football League (CFL) and their 88th season overall. The Blue Bombers would have entered the season as the defending Grey Cup champions for the first time in 29 years, having ended the franchise's lengthy drought with the previous year's championship win in the 107th Grey Cup game. This would have been the seventh season under head coach Mike O'Shea and the seventh full season under general manager Kyle Walters.

Training camps, pre-season games, and regular season games were initially postponed due to the COVID-19 pandemic in Manitoba. The CFL announced on April 7, 2020 that the start of the 2020 season would not occur before July 2020. On May 20, 2020, it was announced that the league would likely not begin regular season play prior to September 2020. On August 17, 2020, however, the season was officially cancelled due to COVID-19.

Offseason

CFL National Draft
The 2020 CFL National Draft took place on April 30, 2020. By virtue of finishing as Grey Cup champions in the previous season, the Blue Bombers selected last in each round of the eight-round draft, not including any traded picks. The team made one trade, acquiring Grey Cup starting quarterback, Zach Collaros, and a fifth-round pick from the Toronto Argonauts for the Blue Bombers' third-round pick and a conditional pick. The condition of that trade was whether Collaros re-signed with Winnipeg, which he did, meaning that the Blue Bombers sent their first-round selection to the Argonauts. On August 17 however, the season was officially cancelled due to COVID-19.

CFL Global Draft
The 2020 CFL Global Draft was scheduled to take place on April 16, 2020. However, due to the COVID-19 pandemic, this draft and its accompanying combine were postponed to occur just before the start of training camp, which was ultimately cancelled. The Blue Bombers were scheduled to select ninth in each round with the number of rounds never announced.

Planned schedule

Preseason

Regular season

Team

Roster

Coaching staff

References

Winnipeg Blue Bombers seasons
2020 Canadian Football League season by team
2020 in Manitoba